The 1930–31 season was the 4th season of competitive football in the British Mandate for Palestine under the Eretz Israel Football Association. During the season, the Arab Palestine Sports Federation was established as a rival to the Jewish-controlled EIFA.

IFA Competitions

1930–31 Palestine League

An attempt was made to organize a Palestine League, with the participation of 11 clubs, both Jewish and British, in the top division and a second division divided into four regional leagues. However, league matches were suspended in November 1930 as British military teams were ordered not to play Jewish teams due to the tensions between the British Mandate government and the Jewish community following the publication of the Passfield white paper. An attempt to revive the league with Jewish clubs only also failed.

Table

1930–31 Second Division
Along with the first division, the EIFA planned to operate a Second Division (Mahlaka Bet), which was planned to be divided into four regional divisions, with mostly junior and reserve teams. It seems that Maccabi Yona won the Jerusalem division, During the season some of the participating teams withdrew from the competition, which forced the EIFA to operate just one division in the Tel Aviv area.

Jerusalem division
48th Regiment B 
Arzib
British Police Res.
Hapoel Jerusalem Res.
Hercules
Maccabi HaSemel
Maccabi Nordia A
Maccabi Nordia B
Maccabi Yonah
YMCA

Tel Aviv A division
48th Regiment B
Bar Kochva Petah Tikva
Hapoel Bnei Brak
Hapoel HaSharon
Hapoel Nes Tziona
Hapoel Petah Tikva
Hapoel Tel Aviv Res.
Hapoel Tel Aviv C
Jaffa Survey Department
Maccabi Herzliya
Maccabi Nes Tziona

Tel Aviv B division
Hapoel Bemali Tel Aviv
Hapoel Rehovot
Jaffa Police
Maccabi HaSharon
Maccabi Nordia Tel Aviv
Maccabi Petah Tikva Res.
Maccabi Rehovot
Maccabi Tel Aviv Res.
Maccabi Trumpeldor Tel Aviv
Palestine General Hospital
RAF Ramla Res.

Haifa division
Islamic SC
Haifa Police B
Hapoel Binyamina
Hapoel Hadera
Hapoel Haifa Res.
Hapoel Naharayim
Hapoel Nesher
Maccabi Hadera
Maccabi HaGibor Haifa
Maccabi Zikhron Ya’akov
Staffords B

Notable events
 In October 1930 the Hapoel organization held the second Hapoel Games in Tel Aviv. In a single football match during the event a Jerusalem XI team (composed of Maccabi Hasmonean Jerusalem and British Police players) met a Hapoel XI (composed of Hapoel Tel Aviv and Hapoel Haifa players). The Hapoel XI won 2–0.
 In a meeting in held in June 1930 in Jaffa, the Arab Palestine Sports Federation was established, as a governing body for Arab sport activities.
 The football and tennis teams of the Egyptian University performed a brief tour in Tel Aviv and Jerusalem in February 1931. The football team played against Maccabi Tel Aviv, who were beaten 0–4 by the University XI, against The Orthodox Club of Jaffa, who were beaten 2–5, and a combined Maccabi Hashmonai and British Police XI, which had beaten the Egyptians 4–0
 In early March 1931 Hapoel Haifa visited Beirut, losing 1–3 to the American University of Beirut (AUB) XI, and beating Al Nahda SC 8–4. A week later Hapoel Tel Aviv made the same trip, losing 3–4 to the AUB XI, and 0–2 to Nahda.
 A Mandatory Palestine team, made of Hapoel players, took part in the 1931 Workers' Summer Olympiad football tournament, losing 1–3 to Hungary in the first round, and losing 0–4 to Norway in the consolation tournament. The single goal for the Hapoel team was scored by Stern.

References